The CSRA Football Classic is an annual American football game played in Augusta, Georgia.

History
The first CSRA Classic was held in 1992 at Butler High School Stadium in Augusta, Georgia. The 2009 matchup marked the first time the game was played at Lucy Craft Laney High School Stadium.
The CSRA Classic changed in 2010 to Augusta City Classic, Inc., with the office now located at 925 Laney Walker Boulevard.

Game results

See also
List of black college football classics

References

Black college football classics